Richard L. Rapson (born March 8, 1937, in New York) is professor emeritus of American history at the University of Hawaiʻi at Mānoa.

Background 
Rapson earned his B.A. magna cum laude at Amherst College in June 1958, and served briefly there as an instructor in American Studies. He then taught history at Stanford University from 1961 to 1965 while pursuing his Ph.D. at Columbia University, granted in 1966. His dissertation was on The British Traveler in America, 1860–1935; his doctoral advisor was Richard Hofstadter.

In 1966, after teaching history at University of California at Santa Barbara, he moved to Hawaii, and has been on the faculty of the University of Hawaii system ever since. He has returned to Stanford as a Visiting Professor of History (1973–74), and been a Visiting Professor of History four separate semesters on Semester at Sea, a University shipboard program that sails around the world. Rapson worked as a psychotherapist for 15 years, beginning in 1982. He was also named National Finalist for the Danforth Foundation's Distinguished Teaching Award, which honored the nation's best teachers. He founded and headed the University of Hawaii's experimental liberal arts college, New College, from 1968 to 1973.

Rapson has written many books and short stories.  Some of these were written with his wife, Dr. Elaine Hatfield. He has one child, Dr. Kim Elizabeth Rapson.

Notable publications 

 (1968). Individualism and Conformity in the American Character. Lexington, Mass: D.C. Heath. 
 (1971). Britons View America: Travel Commentary, 1860–1935. Seattle: University of Washington Press. 
 (1971). The Cult of Youth in Middle-Class America. Lexington, Mass: D.C. Heath. 0669733873
 (1971). Major Interpretations of the American Past. New York: Irvington. 
 (1982). Denials of Doubt: An Interpretation of American History. Lanham, Md.: University Press of America. 
 (1980). Fairly Lucky You Live Hawaii! Cultural Pluralism in the 50th State. Lanham, Md.: University Press of America. 
 (1988). American Yearnings: Love, Money, and Endless Possibility. New York: XLibris. 
 (2003). Amazed by Life: Confessions of a Non-Religious Believer. New York: XLibris. 
 (2007). Magical Thinking and the Decline of America. New York: XLibris. 

Co-Authored with Elaine Hatfield
 (1993). Love, sex, and intimacy: Their psychology, biology, and history. New York: HarperCollins. 
 (1994). Emotional contagion. New York: Cambridge University Press. 
 (1996/2005). Love and sex: Cross-cultural perspectives. Needham Heights, MA: Allyn & Bacon.  Reprint: Lanham, MD: University Press of America. .
 (2020). What's Next in Love and Sex: Psychological and Cultural Perspectives. New York: Oxford University Press,

Interviews
 Heydeck, Elisabeth. "Erklär mir Liebe—Viel Lärm um Nichts?” ZDF (German Public Television) Science Documentary. 2011.
 Miller, Lulu. "Entanglement." National Public Radio Invisibilia Series. January 30, 2015.
 Roller, Emma. "Donald Trump's Unstoppable Virility." The New York Times. December 29, 2015.
 Sex During Wartime: History Under the Covers – 9-part series (Sex in WWII: The Home Front and Sex in WWII: The European Front). The History Channel. 2002.

References 

Arthur Goodfriend, The Life and Death of New College. Honolulu: University of Hawaii Press, 1974.

External links 

Amherst College Authors 

Richard Rapson, University of Hawaii 

20th-century American Jews
Amherst College faculty
Living people
Stanford University Department of History faculty
University of Hawaiʻi faculty
1937 births
21st-century American historians
21st-century American male writers
American male non-fiction writers
21st-century American Jews